Thomas Edward Hall (born November 23, 1947) is an American former professional baseball left-handed pitcher who played in Major League Baseball (MLB) from 1968 to 1977.

Early life 
Hall was born in Thomasville, North Carolina, and attended Ramona High School in Riverside, California. He graduated from Riverside City College in 1966 and was drafted by Bill Rigney in the same year.

Career 
Hall was drafted by the Minnesota Twins in the third round of the 1966 MLB January Draft – Regular Phase.

Hall pitched for the Twins, Cincinnati Reds, New York Mets, and Kansas City Royals during his big league career. He was with the Reds during their early years as the "Big Red Machine", during which time they won two National League Western Division championships and one National League (NL) pennant.

Hall was traded by the Twins to the Reds for Wayne Granger on December 3, 1971. Hall made his final Major League appearance on May 21, 1977, with the Royals. He had a career record of 52-33 with 32 saves.

After retiring from baseball, Hall worked as a supervisor at Rohr, Inc. After being laid off in 1981, he joined the United States Postal Service as a mail carrier. He retired after 20 years.

References

External links

Tom Hall at Baseball Almanac

1947 births
Living people
African-American baseball players
Major League Baseball pitchers
Baseball players from North Carolina
Minnesota Twins players
Cincinnati Reds players
New York Mets players
Kansas City Royals players
Tacoma Twins players
Denver Bears players
Charlotte Hornets (baseball) players
Wisconsin Rapids Twins players
Orlando Twins players
21st-century African-American people
20th-century African-American sportspeople